The 1972 West Texas State Buffaloes football team was an American football team that represented West Texas State University (now known as West Texas A&M University) as a member of the Missouri Valley Conference during the 1972 NCAA University Division football season. In their second year under head coach Gene Mayfield, the team compiled a 5–5 record (4–1 in the MVC).

Schedule

References

West Texas State
West Texas A&M Buffaloes football seasons
Missouri Valley Conference football champion seasons
West Texas State Buffaloes football